Marc Bridge-Wilkinson (born 16 March 1979) is an English football coach and former player.

A left-sided midfielder and also a winger, he was known for his goal-scoring ability. He started his career at Derby County in 1998, but instead made his name at Port Vale following his transfer to Vale Park in 2000. He made 140 appearances in four years, scoring 36 goals in all competitions, and lifting the Football League Trophy in 2001. He spent the 2004–05 season with Stockport County, before signing with Bradford City in 2005. He spent two years at Bradford, making 95 a total of appearances. He signed with Carlisle United in 2007, and went on to pick up a Football League Trophy runners-up medal with the club in 2010. After four years with Carlisle, he joined Darlington in 2011, breaking his run of ten consecutive seasons in the third tier of English football. With Darlington he lifted the FA Trophy in 2011, before his contract was terminated in January 2012. He was re-signed to Darlington on a non-contract basis until the club folded in the summer of 2012. He went on to coach at Huddersfield Town and Liverpool.

Career

Derby County
Born in Coventry, Bridge-Wilkinson was a product of the Derby County youth academy and made his debut for Derby in a 2–1 victory against Liverpool at Anfield on 7 November 1998. This Premier League clash would be his only appearance for the club. He joined Carlisle United of the Third Division, where he played seven games in a six-week loan spell at the end of the 1998–99 season. He returned to Derby and was released by the club at the end of the following season, after which he was given a trial at Port Vale.

Port Vale
Bridge-Wilkinson joined Port Vale on a free transfer following his trial and made his debut in a 4–1 defeat at Oldham Athletic on 12 August 2000. The following week he scored twice in his first Vale start when they defeated Oxford United 3–0. He scored fourteen goals in 52 games throughout his first season at Vale, which included one in the final of the Football League Trophy final – which Vale won 2–1 over Brentford. He also scored the winner in the Potteries derby in the Northern Section semi-finals with a 105th minute golden-goal penalty.

He spent much of the next season out with a hamstring injury, and did not feature between August and late-January. His return to the side coincided with Vale's climb up the table, and he consequently signed a new two-year contract with the club. Recovering from a knee injury, his nine goals in 2002–03 were enough to make him the club's top-scorer, as the Second Division club posted a mid-table finish. He struck seven times in 37 games during the 2003–04 campaign, as the club finished outside of the play-offs on goal difference. At the end of the season manager Martin Foyle offered him a new contract at reduced pay due to the club's dire financial situation, an offer which Bridge-Wilkinson rejected in order to sign for League One rivals Stockport County on a two-year contract in June 2004.

Stockport County
Bridge-Wilkinson made just 22 starts with Stockport, and in February 2005 joined Bradford City, also of League One, on a month's loan deal to cover for injuries. The loan soon become a permanent transfer.

Bradford City
Bridge-Wilkinson made his City debut on 25 February 2005 in a 1–1 draw with Walsall and after four games he signed a two-year deal on transfer deadline day to stay at Valley Parade permanently. He celebrated his new contract with his first Bradford goal in a 1–1 draw with Doncaster Rovers later the same day. He scored another two goals in a 4–1 victory over Brentford, finishing the season with three goals from his 12 games.

At the start of the following season he missed more than two months after sustaining a knee injury in training. He finished the season with six goals in forty games. On 16 September 2006, he scored against his former club Port Vale, but it was just one of four goals for Bridge-Wilkinson that season, as Bradford were relegated into League Two. He was one of many players released by Bradford in May 2007.

Carlisle United
In June 2007, Bridge-Wilkinson rejoined Carlisle United. He played 52 games in his first full season at the club, including both legs of the League One play-off semi-final with Leeds United. He scored Carlisle's second at Elland Road to give his side a 2–1 first leg victory. However, in the second leg he could not help his side avoid a 2–0 defeat.

A regular in 2008–09, he picked up a toe injury in January, which ended his contribution to the campaign. The problem was a floating bone in his big toe. He made 26 appearances in 2009–10, as Carlisle posted a mid-table finish. He also made an appearance at Wembley Stadium in the Football League Trophy Final, which ended in a 4–1 defeat to Southampton.

Darlington
Searching for first team football, in October 2010 he joined Conference National outfit Darlington on loan for one month. After the midfielder impressed manager Mark Cooper, this one month then got extended until January.

On 18 January 2011, he signed for Darlington on a permanent basis after he was released from Carlisle United two days earlier. He scored the first hat-trick of his career in a 6–1 victory against Eastbourne Borough on 12 February. All Bridge-Wilkinson's goals, which included two penalties, came in the first half and within the space of 14 minutes. At the end of the campaign he picked up the second significant honour of his career, as Darlington lifted the 2011 FA Trophy with a 1–0 victory over Mansfield Town at Wembley. Darlington suffered financial difficulties during Bridge-Wilkinson's time at the club and his contract was terminated on 16 January 2012, along with the rest of the playing squad and caretaker manager Craig Liddle; he stated that "to say I feel sick is an understatement". However a surprise decision meant that the club would continue to complete their remaining fixtures, and Bridge-Wilkinson returned to Darlington on a non-contract basis. Darlington were relegated at the end of the 2011–12 season, having been deducted ten points for entering administration and as the club reformed to Darlington 1883 in the Northern Football League, Bridge-Wilkinson left the club and had a trial at League Two outfit Accrington Stanley.

Style of play
Bridge-Wilkinson was a good technical midfielder who had an eye for goal. He had good composure, movement and possession skills.

Coaching career
Bridge-Wilkinson spent three years as a coach at the Academy at Huddersfield Town, before he was appointed under-14 coach at Liverpool's Academy in 2015. He was promoted to under-16 coach in July 2018 and then to under-18 coach in May 2020.

Career statistics

Honours
Port Vale
Football League Trophy: 2001

Carlisle United
Football League Trophy runner-up: 2010

Darlington
FA Trophy: 2011

References

1979 births
Living people
Footballers from Coventry
English footballers
Association football midfielders
Derby County F.C. players
Carlisle United F.C. players
Port Vale F.C. players
Stockport County F.C. players
Bradford City A.F.C. players
Darlington F.C. players
Premier League players
English Football League players
National League (English football) players
Association football coaches
Huddersfield Town A.F.C. non-playing staff
Liverpool F.C. non-playing staff